Hellings is a surname. Notable people with the surname include:

Dick Hellings (1874–1938), English rugby player
Hellings (baseball), American baseball player
Mack Hellings (1915–1951), American racing driver
Peter Hellings (1916–1990), English military officer
Sergio Hellings (born 1984), Dutch footballer
Sarah Hellings (born 1945), TV director whose credits include Midsomer Murders

See also
Helling